The Billy Bishop Home & Museum is a museum and National Historic Site of Canada in Owen Sound, Ontario, Canada that commemorates the life and achievements of World War I flying ace and Victoria Cross winner Air Marshall William Avery "Billy" Bishop VC, CB, DSO and Bar, MC, DFC, and to Canada's aviation history. The museum is located at his birthplace and childhood home before he went to Royal Military College of Canada in Kingston, Ontario. It features displays of artifacts including uniforms, medals, photos, models, etc. from Canadians who fought in the air during World War I and World War II, as well as a tribute to the "Red Baron" Manfred von Richthofen. The house has the original hardwood floors, Victorian furnishings and other personal possessions of the Bishop family. A gift shop is open during museum hours.

Bishop's modest gravesite is also in Owen Sound in Greenwood Cemetery.
A plaque at the Billy Bishop Museum dedicated to William Avery "Billy" Bishop 1894-1956 was erected by the Historic Sites and Monuments Board of Canada. "Billy Bishop was renowned as a pilot with the Royal Flying Corps and Royal Air Force during World War I by shooting down at least 72 enemy aircraft and leading other daring missions against the enemy. For these exploits, he was awarded the Victoria Cross, the D.S.O. and other medals for bravery, becoming Canada's most decorated serviceman next to fellow aviator William Barker. Born in Owen Sound, he was educated here and at Royal Military College of Canada, Kingston. His later life was spent largely in England and Montreal. During part of World War II he served with the Royal Canadian Air Force in Ottawa as an honorary Air Marshal."

Affiliations
The Museum is affiliated with: CMA, CHIN, and Virtual Museum of Canada.

See also 
 Billy Bishop
 Billy Bishop Goes to War

References

External links

Biographical museums in Canada
Historic house museums in Ontario
Owen Sound
Museums in Grey County
National Historic Sites in Ontario
Designated heritage properties in Ontario